Ephraim "Ephie" Fitzgerald (born 1961) is an Irish Gaelic football manager  who played as a right corner-forward at senior level for the Cork county team. He has been manager of the Waterford county team since 2021.

Career
Born in Cork, Fitzgerald first played competitive Gaelic football whilst at school at Coláiste Chríost Rí. He arrived on the inter-county scene at the age of seventeen when he first linked up with the Cork minor team, before later lining out with the under-21 side. He made his senior debut in the 1982 championship. Fitzgerald went on to play a brief role for the team over the next few years, winning one Munster medal.

At club level Fitzgerald is a four-time All-Ireland medallist with Nemo Rangers. He has also won five Munster medals and five championship medals.

Throughout his career Fitzgerald made 3 championship appearances for Cork. He retired from inter-county football following the conclusion of the 1983 championship.

In retirement from playing Fitzgerald has become involved in coaching and team management. At club level he has guided Nemo Rangers and Ballylanders to championship success, while at inter-county level he has served as manager of the Cork minor team and coach of the Limerick senior team. In October 2014 Fitzgerald was appointed as a coach and a selector to the Clare senior team.

He managed the Cork senior ladies' football team until 2021.

In October 2021, he was appointed for a two-year term as Waterford senior manager.

Honours

Player
Nemo Rangers
All-Ireland Senior Club Football Championship (3): 1982, 1984, 1988, 1994
Munster Senior Club Football Championship (5): 1981, 1983, 1987 (c), 1988, 1993
Cork Senior Club Football Championship (5): 1981, 1983, 1987 (c), 1988, 1993

Cork
Munster Senior Football Championship (1): 1983
All-Ireland Under-21 Football Championship (2): 1980, 1981
Munster Under-21 Football Championship (3): 1980, 1981, 1982

Manager/coach
Nemo Rangers
Munster Senior Club Football Championship (2): 2005, 2007
Cork Senior Club Football Championship (4): 2005, 2006, 2007, 2008

Ballylanders
Limerick Senior Club Football Championship (1): 2014

Cork Ladies
All-Ireland Senior Ladies' Football Championship (1): 2016
Ladies' National Football League (2): 2016, 2017

References

1961 births
Living people
Gaelic football forwards
Gaelic football managers
Cork inter-county Gaelic footballers
Irish schoolteachers
Ladies' Gaelic football managers
Nemo Rangers Gaelic footballers
People educated at Coláiste Chríost Rí